The third and final season of the Mexican television series Rosario Tijeras also known as Rosario Tijeras 3: Hasta el final was announced on 16 December 2018. The season premiered on 25 August 2019, and ended on 14 December 2019.

Production of the season began in January 2019 and ended in June 2019.

Plot 
Rosario's world collapses when her daughter, Ruby, is kidnapped. To recover her, she will have to accept to collaborate with the police, being part of an elite squad dedicated to the capture of El Ángel. Rosario must work against the clock and with the feelings to the surface, because in the neighborhood nothing is what it seems.

Cast 
 Bárbara de Regil as Rosario Tijeras
 Sebastián Martínez as Daniel Salgado "El Ángel"
 Juan Pablo Campa as Dylan
 Mauricio Islas as General Iriarte
 Samadhi Zendejas as Géminis
 Verónica Langer as Aurora
 Harold Azuara as Erik
 Pamela Almanza as Laura Peralta
 Marina Ruíz as Pamela
 Alejandro Guerrero as Capitán Bravo
 Marco León as Máicol
 Nikole Barajas as Rubí
 Guillermo Nava as Verdugo
 Renata Vaca as Julieth
 Roberto Duarte as Altamirano
 Jorge Lan as Agustín
 Christian Vega as Bernardo
 Claudette Maillé as Vanesa
 Roberto Montiel as Don Pacho
 Laura Ferretti as Marisol

Recurring and guests 
 Hernán Mendoza as León Elías Arteaga
 Begoña Narváez as Martina
 Jordi Rush as Santiago
 Alex Galindo as Langosta

Episodes

References 

2019 Mexican television seasons